is a Japanese manga artist and film director. He is probably best known for his Golden Boy manga series, which debuted in 1992. Egawa is known for his drawings of over-the-top facial expressions always crediting the staff of his creations, even on the covers (crediting the works to "Egawa and his assistants"). Kōsuke Fujishima, who is known as the creator of Oh My Goddess, was once one of Egawa's assistants.

Early life
Egawa was born in Chikusa-ku, Nagoya, Aichi Prefecture, Japan. He has a degree in mathematics and taught junior high mathematics for five months before transitioning into the manga industry.

Career 
Egawa moved to Tokyo to work under manga artist Hiroshi Motomiya for four months in 1983. His big break came when his story "Don't Give Up" won Comic Morning's open contest. His first serialized series was Be Free! for Comic Morning, where he was recommended by Hiroshi.

Egawa has cited manga artists Go Nagai and Shigeru Mizuki as influences.

Directing 
He has also written and directed live-action pornographic films. In 2003 he started an association with the Japanese adult video (AV) studio Soft On Demand (SOD) under its president Ganari Takahashi. His first video with the company, was released August 8, 2003 as SOD production SDDM-311, and marked the AV debut of actress Reika Yoshizawa. His second work for SOD,  (SDDM-336), starring Ai Kurosawa, came out in October 2003. A third video, released in February 2004,  (SDDM-404), with actress Shizuku Tsukino, contained some bondage elements.

In 2006, Egawa directed his first live-action film, Tokyo University Story, based on his manga of the same name. The film, produced by SOD, was released theatrically in Japan in February 2006. Four years later, he directed his second theatrical feature,  about a group of ten people mysteriously trapped in a room to play the "King Game", a Japanese version of "Truth or Dare". The film, from an original story by Egawa, made its debut in Tokyo's Shinjuku district at K's Cinema on August 28, 2010. One of the actresses in the film is Nana Natsume, a former AV actress who began working for SOD in late 2003.

Manga works
 Be Free!
 Dead Man
 ONE-ZERO-NINE
 The Last Man
 Take-chan and Papa
 Golden Boy
 Happy Boy
 Magical Taluluto
 Tokyo Daigaku Monogatari
 Russo-Japanese War Story
 Genji Monogatari
 Golden Boy II ~ Sasurai no O-Benkyō Yarō: Geinō-kai Ōabare-hen

Filmography
Akogare no katei kyōshi, 2003 (adult video)
Akogare no ofisu redi, 2003 (adult video)
Akogare no sentō in, 2004 (adult video)
Tokyo University Story, 2006
King Game (KING GAME キングゲーム), 2010

References

External links

 

 
1961 births
Manga artists from Aichi Prefecture
Japanese pornographic film directors
Living people
People from Nagoya
Aichi University of Education alumni